Polaromonas is a genus of Gram-negative bacteria from the family Comamonadaceae. Polaromonas species are psychrophiles.

References

Comamonadaceae
Bacteria genera